The Institut de l'information scientifique et technique, or INIST is the CNRS centre of documentation located in France. It has as mission to collect, treat and diffuse results of scientific and technical research. The INIST produces three bibliographic multilingual and multidisciplinary databases: PASCAL, FRANCIS, and DOGE. It is based at Vandœuvre-lès-Nancy, in a building designed by Jean Nouvel. In addition, INIST publishes a number of electronic journals.

Directors 

Goéry Delacôte

References

External links 
 
 I-Revues, E-Journal portal of INIST

French National Centre for Scientific Research